Nicu Gingă (born 10 March 1953) is a retired flyweight Greco-Roman wrestler from Romania. He competed at the 1976 and 1980 Olympics and finished second and fourth, respectively. He won the world title in 1973 and 1977, placing second in 1978 and third in 1974.

References

External links
 

1953 births
Living people
Olympic wrestlers of Romania
Wrestlers at the 1976 Summer Olympics
Wrestlers at the 1980 Summer Olympics
Romanian male sport wrestlers
Olympic silver medalists for Romania
Olympic medalists in wrestling
Medalists at the 1976 Summer Olympics
Universiade medalists in wrestling
Universiade silver medalists for Romania
European Wrestling Championships medalists
World Wrestling Championships medalists
Medalists at the 1981 Summer Universiade
20th-century Romanian people
21st-century Romanian people